José Osmar Ventura da Paz (born 10 November 1989), known by his nickname Mazinho, is a Brazilian footballer who currently plays as a midfielder for Paraná.

Career statistics

Club

Notes

References

1989 births
Living people
Brazilian footballers
Association football midfielders
Campeonato Brasileiro Série B players
Campeonato Brasileiro Série C players
Campeonato Brasileiro Série D players
Operário Ferroviário Esporte Clube players
Ipanema Atlético Clube players
Centro Esportivo Olhodagüense players
América Futebol Clube (RN) players
Associação Atlética Coruripe players
Club Sportivo Sergipe players
Agremiação Sportiva Arapiraquense players
Centro Sportivo Alagoano players
Ferroviário Atlético Clube (CE) players
Associação Desportiva São Caetano players